Waughtown–Belview Historic District is a national historic district located at Winston-Salem, Forsyth County, North Carolina.  The district encompasses 1,137 contributing buildings, 1 contributing site, and 1 contributing object in a largely residential section of Winston-Salem.  The buildings date from about 1834 to 1955, and include notable examples of Greek Revival, Colonial Revival, Queen Anne, and Bungalow / American Craftsman style architecture. Located in the district is the separately listed Shell Service Station. Other notable resources include the Clodfelter House (c. 1850), Fiddler House (c. 1900), Nissen Wagon Works smokestack, Triangle Body Works (c. 1927), Waughtown Baptist Church (1919), Waughtown Presbyterian Church (1914), Southside Christian Church (c. 1915), and Waughtown Cemetery.

It was listed on the National Register of Historic Places in 2005.

References

Historic districts on the National Register of Historic Places in North Carolina
Greek Revival architecture in North Carolina
Colonial Revival architecture in North Carolina
Queen Anne architecture in North Carolina
Buildings and structures in Winston-Salem, North Carolina
National Register of Historic Places in Winston-Salem, North Carolina